Crystal Creek is a stream in Lewis County, New York, USA. The stream flows into the Black River near New Bremen.

References 

Rivers of New York (state)